Eggnog is an EP by American sludge metal band Melvins. It was released in 1991 on Boner Records.

Track listing

Personnel
King Buzzo – vocals, guitar
Lorax – bass
Dale – drums, backing vocals

Additional personnel
Jonathan Burnside – engineer
Billy Anderson – engineer
Diana Berry – cover photos

Trivia
A small sample from "Hog Leg" appeared in Beck's song "Beercan". King Buzzo also appears a couple of times in the song's video.

References

1991 EPs
Albums produced by Billy Anderson (producer)
Melvins EPs
Boner Records albums